Shadow Cabinet of Harriet Harman may refer to either of two United Kingdom Shadow Cabinets formed by Harriet Harman in separate stints as acting Leader of the Labour Party:

First Shadow Cabinet of Harriet Harman, following the resignation of Gordon Brown as Labour Leader following the party's loss at the 2010 general election
Second Shadow Cabinet of Harriet Harman, formed after Ed Miliband resigned as leader in the wake of the 2015 general election